Turbonilla lillybeckae is a species of sea snails, a marine gastropod mollusc in the family Pyramidellidae, the pyrams and their allies.

Description
The shell grows to a length of 9.5 mm.

Distribution
This marine species occurs in the Caribbean Sea off St. Croix, Virgin Islands.

References

External links
 To Encyclopedia of Life
 To World Register of Marine Species

lillybeckae
Gastropods described in 1969